Suzanne de Troeye (1908-1999) was a French film editor. She worked with directors such as Marcel Pagnol, Marc Allégret and Jean Renoir.

Selected filmography
 Toni (1935)
 Merlusse (1935)
 César (1936)
 Harvest (1937)
 The Baker's Wife (1938)
 Heartbeat (1938)
 La Bête Humaine (1938)
 The Man from London (1943)
 Strange Inheritance (1943)
 First on the Rope (1944)
 Girl with Grey Eyes (1945)
 Father Goriot (1945)
 Patrie (1946)
 Victor (1951)
 Julietta (1953)
 Lady Chatterley's Lover (1955)
 Love Is at Stake (1957)
 Girl on the Road (1962)
 Highway Pickup (1963)

References

Bibliography 
 Crisp, Colin. French Cinema—A Critical Filmography: Volume 1, 1929-1939. Indiana University Press, 2015.

External links 
 

1908 births
1989 deaths
People from Vincennes
French film editors
French women film editors